Los Depas are a Mexican rock band from Queretaro, formed in 2007. The band consists of Julio Saucedo (vocals, harmonica, percussions), Javier Barba (guitars), Andres Soler (bass), Felipe Hernandez (guitars, backing vocal), Diego Mazariegos (drums, percussion, vocals) and Carlos Oviedo (keyboard, vocals).

History

Formation (2007)

Band members
Current members
Julio Saucedo – lead vocals, harmonica (2007–present)
Javier Barba – lead guitar (2007–present)
Felipe Hernandez – rhythm guitar (2007–present)
Andres Soler – bass (2014–present)
Diego Mazariegos – drums (2011–present)
Carlos Oviedo – Keyboard, vocals (2017–present)

Former members
Jorge Coronado – bass (2007–2008)
Jorge Climaco – drums (2007–2011)
Marco Santamaria – bass (2008–2014)

Timeline

Mexican rock music groups